Michikamau Lake, in Labrador, Canada, was absorbed into Smallwood Reservoir upon the completion of the Churchill Falls Generating Station in 1974. The lake makes up the largest part of the eastern section of the reservoir, while Lobstick Lake, also absorbed in Smallwood's creation, makes up the largest part of the western section.

Reaching the lake was the goal of an expedition by Leonidas Hubbard, Dillon Wallace, and George Elson described in Wallace's memoir, The Lure Of The Labrador Wild.

References

Lakes of Newfoundland and Labrador